The current capital of Sri Lanka is Sri Jayawardenepura Kotte. In the course of history, the national capital has been in many locations other than Sri Jayawardenepura Kotte.

List of capitals

Mythological
 Abhayanagara, Unknown. Capital of Abhaya, King of Sri Lanka (then known as Ojadīpa) in the time of Kakusandha Buddha.
 Sirīsavatthu, Until 543 BC

Historical
Pre Anuradhapura period (543–377 BC) 
 Tambapaṇṇī, 543 BC–505 BC
 Upatissagāma, 505 BC–504 BC
 Vijithapura, 504–474 BC
 Upatissagāma, 474 BC–438 BC
 Anurādhapura, 438 BC–437 BC

Anuradhapura period (437 BC–1017)
 Anurādhapura, 437 BC–7th century AD
 Sigiriya, 473–491 (During the reign of Kassapa I (473–491))
 Anurādhapura, 7th century–667
 Polonnaruwa, 667‑683 (During the reign of Aggabodhi IV (667‑683))
 Anurādhapura, 683–772
 Polonnaruwa, 772‑777 (During the reign of Aggabodhi VII (772‑777))
 Anurādhapura, 777–797
 Polonnaruwa, 797‑801 (During the reign of Udaya I (797‑801))
 Anurādhapura, 801–833
 Polonnaruwa, 833‑853 (During the reign of Sena I (833‑853))
 Anurādhapura, 853–1029

Polonnaruwa period (1017–1232)
Chola conquest of Anuradhapura
 Polonnaruwa (Chola), 1029–1055
 Rohana (Sinhalese), 1029–1055

Polonnaruwa period
 Polonnaruwa, 1055– 1232

Transitional period (1232–1597)
 Polonnaruwa, 1232–1255
 Dambadeniya, 1255–1270s (During the reigns of Vijayabahu III (1232–1236), Parakramabahu II (1236–1270), Vijayabahu IV (1270–1272) & part of Bhuvanaikabahu I (1272–1284))
 Yapahuwa, 1270s–1284 (Part of the reign of Bhuvanaikabahu I (1272–1284))
 Polonnaruwa, 1287–1293 (During the reign of Parakramabahu III (1287–1293))
 Kurunegala, 13th century–14th century (During the reigns of Bhuvanaikabahu II (1293–1302) & Parakramabahu IV (1302–1326))
 Gampola, 1341–1356 (During the reign of Bhuvanaikabahu IV (1341–1351) & part of the reign of Parakramabahu V (1344–1359))
 Dedigama, 1356–1359 (During the co-reigns of Parakramabahu V & Vikramabahu III (1356–1359))
 Gampola, 1359–1374 (Part of the reign of Vikramabahu III (1356–1374) & part of the reign of Bhuvanaikabahu V (1371–1408))
 Sri Jayawardenepura Kotte, 1371–1597 (During the reign of Bhuvanaikabahu V (1371–1408)), capital of the Kingdom of Kotte)
 Rayigama, 1411–1414  (During the early part of the reign of Parakramabahu VI (1411–1466)) 

Kandyan period (1597–1815)
 Kandy, 1597–1815

British Ceylon period (1815–1948) 
 Colombo, 1815–1948

Modern Sri Lanka (1948–present)
 Colombo, 1948–1982
 Sri Jayawardenepura Kotte, 1982–present

Others
Transitional period (1232–1597)
When the island was divided during the Transitional period, multiple capital cities existed at one time. 

 Nallur, 1255–1620 (capital of the Jaffna Kingdom)
 Kandy, 1469–1597 (During the early part of the reign of Senasammata Vikramabahu (1469–1511), capital of the Kingdom of Kandy)
 Sitawaka, 1521–1594 (capital of the Kingdom of Sitawaka)

See also
 List of national capitals by population

Notes

References

Citations

Bibliography

 
 

 
 
 
 
 
 
 
 
 
 
 
 
 
 
 
 

Sri Lanka
 
Political history of Sri Lanka